Ybarra is a surname of Basque origin, and may refer to:

 Dustin Ybarra, American stand-up comedian and actor
 Javier Ybarra Bergé, Basque industrialist, writer, and politician
 Joe Ybarra, American video game producer
 Mike Ybarra, American video game industry executive
 Rocío Ybarra, Spanish hockey player
 Sam Ybarra, American soldier

See also
 Ibarra
 Ybarra v. Spangard, a leading legal decision in California discussing the exclusive control element of res ipsa loquitur.

Basque-language surnames